Below is a list of current rosters of teams from ABA League First Division.

There are a total of 14 teams in the First Division.

Borac Čačak

Budućnost VOLI

Cedevita Olimpija

Cibona

Crvena zvezda mts

FMP

Igokea

Mega Basket

Mornar

MZT Skopje Aerodrom

Partizan NIS

Split

Studentski centar

Zadar

See also 
 List of current ABA League Second Division team rosters
 List of current Basketball League of Serbia team rosters

Notes

External links
First Division Official Website